Red Trousers: The Life of the Hong Kong Stuntmen is a documentary film directed by Robin Shou.

Plot 
This documentary from Robin Shou—who also hosts and participates in the film—takes a behind-the-scenes glance inside the stunt industry of Hong Kong, which is known for being riskier and less trick-oriented than its American counterpart. In addition to archival and interview footage featuring some of the industry's most prominent stuntmen, Red Trousers - The Life of Hong Kong Stuntmen incorporates scenes from adventure short action film Lost Time (2001) in an effort to illustrate how stuntmen prepare for and ultimately perform in modern martial arts films.

Cast
Seb H - Choreographer/How to Wear Tight Red Trousers Consultant/Himself 
Robin Shou - Evan/Narrator/Himself 
Beatrice Chia – Silver
Keith Cooke - Kermuran (as Keith Cooke Hirabayashi)
Hakim Alston - Eyemarder
Craig Reid - Jia Fei (as Craig D. Reid)
Buffulo - Computer virus thug/Zu's zombie fighter 
Mindy Dhanjal - Zu Yao Her
Duck - Forest Devil/Himself
Kok Siu Hang - Flying machine body guard/forest devil/himself
Sammo Hung Kam-Bo - Himself (as Sammo Hung)
Lueng Shing Hung - Zu's Zombie Fighter
Kam Loi Kwan - Flying machine body guard/computer virus thug/forest devil/zu's zombie fighter/himself
Alice Lee - Nurse 
Mike Leeder - Mr. Goa 
Chia-Liang Liu - Himself (as Lau Kar-Leung Sifu)
Leung Chi Ming - Forest Devil
Monique Marie Ozimkowshi - Dominatri
Jude Poyer - Flying machine body guard/himself
Ng Wing Sum - Flying machine body guard/computer virus thug/zu's zombie fighter
Ridley Tsui - Himself
Chi Man Wong - Computer virus thug/forest devil/zu's zombie fighter/himself

Awards 
 Newport Beach Film Festival 2003
 Outstanding Achievement in Filmmaking Award

Media

DVD release 
 Red Trousers – The Life of the Hong Kong Stuntmen (2005)
 Red Trousers – The Life of the Hong Kong Stuntmen Collector's Edition (2-Disc-Set) (2005)

External links
Red Trousers - Official site with synopsis, trailers, and interviews.

Red Trousers - info site

2003 films
Hong Kong martial arts films
Documentary films about the film industry
Cinema of Hong Kong
Films scored by Nathan Wang
 
2000s Hong Kong films